The Swan 86 was a boat designed by German Frers, built by Nautor's Swan and first launched in 1988. It is unusual for swan featuring a keel similar in plan form to 12 metre Australia II.

External links
 Nautor Swan
 German Frers Official Website

References

Sailing yachts
Keelboats
1980s sailboat type designs
Sailboat types built by Nautor Swan
Sailboat type designs by Germán Frers